Sabine Impekoven (16 June 1889 – 25 April  1970) was a German film actress of the silent era. She was married to the actor Leo Peukert and appeared alongside him in several films. She was the sister of Toni Impekoven.

Selected filmography
 Die geheimnisvolle Villa (1914)
 My Leopold (1919)
 King Krause (1919)
 Hasemann's Daughters (1920)
 Doctor Klaus (1920)

References

Bibliography 
Thomas Elsaesser & Michael Wedel. A Second Life: German Cinema's First Decades. Amsterdam University Press, 1996.

External links 
 

1889 births
1970 deaths
German film actresses
German silent film actresses
20th-century German actresses
Actors from Cologne
Burials at Munich Waldfriedhof